André-Romain Prévot (born in Douai, Nord on 22 July 1894, died in Clamart, Hauts-de-Seine on 21 November 1982) was a French bacteriologist. He authored a classification of bacteria, gave his name to a genus of Gram-negative bacteria, prevotella, and created in 1978 the médaille Pasteur of Académie des Sciences of France.

In 1914 as the war starts, he was assigned as an auxiliary physician in Infanterie; he knew the life in the trenches, the murderous battles of the Chemin des Dames, the hell of Verdun where his heroic conduct earned him the Croix de Guerre. This constant communion with suffering and death will influence his taste and direct him towards the medicine to which he will devote himself.

After the armistice he will be released and evacuated to Denmark, where the exchange of medical prisoners takes place. It was there that he met a medical student, Anna Sorensen, whom he married in 1919. They will stay together all their lives and have four children.

He was elected member of Académie des Sciences on 28 January 1963, member of IVe Section de l'Académie Nationale de Médecine in 1966, Officier de la Légion d'Honneur and Grand Officier du Mérite National.

References

External links

French bacteriologists
1894 births
1982 deaths